The 1985 Mississippi State Bulldogs football team represented Mississippi State University during the 1985 NCAA Division I-A football season. Head coach Emory Bellard was fired after the season, the Bulldogs' fourth consecutive losing season.

Schedule

Roster

References

Mississippi State
Mississippi State Bulldogs football seasons
Mississippi State Bulldogs football